Robert Ozn (born Robert Mitchell Warfield Frank Rosen, April 24, 1964 in New York City) -- A Top 5 Billboard USA & Top 10 Music Week UK singer/rapper/writer/producer, he has also recorded under the monikers "DaDa NaDa" and "OZN" (pronounced OH zen), often times integrating social and political themes into commercially successful works. He first attained world wide recognition on MTV as the vocal half of 1980s New York City synthpop duo EBN-OZN, widely credited as the creators of the first-ever commercially charted record produced on a computer and the first "white rap" record to chart mainstream. After a long absence from the music industry working behind the camera, in 2016 Robert "Dada Nada" Ozn released his first single in 25 years achieving major chart comebacks and press coverage in both the US & UK resuming a recording career which continues at this time. Also a screenwriter/film producer and Broadway actor (early career credits as "Robert Rosen"), he is best known for his work as writer/producer (with former Sony Vice-President Colin Greene) of the award-winning, human rights-themed feature film I Witness starring Jeff Daniels, James Spader and Portia de Rossi.

He is also a prominent American bisexual activist having served as the Chair of the Los Angeles Bi Task Force.

Biography

Early life, career and education
As a child, he was a soloist with the New York City Metropolitan Opera Children's Chorus, appearing in numerous productions in both the "Old Met" and Lincoln Center's "New Met," working with directors Franco Zeffirelli, Sir Tyrone Guthrie, conductor Fausto Cleva, singers Leontyne Price, Robert Merrill, Richard Tucker, Jan Peerce Renata Tebaldi, Justino Díaz.

At the age of 16, he was the youngest student to receive a Key Scholarship award from Herbert Berghof acting school (HB Studio) in Greenwich Village.  At 17, he was accepted as a voice and theater major at the Jacobs School of Music Indiana University, where he studied with Norwegian Bass/Baritone Roy Samuelson of the New York City Opera.

As a teenager, he toured as a singer with Doc Severinsen and The Tonight Show Band, working with Lew Tabackin, Ed Shaughnessy, Snooky Young, Tommy Newsom, Ross Tompkins, Buddy Rich and Mel Tormé.

His first professional musical theatre role was that of Hero in a tour of A Funny Thing Happened on the Way to the Forum with Zero Mostel. Shortly after, he created the role of Henry Anderson in the original Broadway cast of the Tony Award-winning musical Shenandoah starring John Cullum, which originally premiered at the Goodspeed Opera House.  Subsequent acting work: leads in Vagabond Stars a pre-Broadway piece at the Berkshire Theater Festival with lyrics written by the Newsroom's Executive Producer/Director Alan Poul, Pirates of Penzance with Karla DeVito, and the LA company of Sam Shepard's Curse of the Starving Class with Gary Sinise and James Gammon.

However, it was not until his supporting lead in a small National Endowment for the Arts film No Regrets directed by Ruth Charny and produced by Ellen Sherman Dateline Executive Producer and his subsequent lead in the Tony nominated Broadway rock musical Marlowe along with Patrick Jude and Lisa Mordente that he came to the attention of the New York music industry, in particular Ron Delsner, who encouraged him to begin his own recording career.

EBN-OZN
In 1981, Rosen met Ned Liben, then the owner of New York's Sundragon Recording Studios. Liben had built his first professional studio at the age of 14 and by the time he met Rosen had worked with Jimi Hendrix, The Talking Heads, Laurie Anderson, The Ramones and a host of New York's rockers.

Their initial collaboration, "AEIOU Sometimes Y" was recorded in 1981–1982 (released in 1983) and was the first American record to be entirely produced on a computer (a Fairlight CMI). "AEIOU" was a mix of rap, spoken word, digital sampling, rock and R&B dance music. DJ Afrika Bambaataa debuted the record in 1982 playing it from a cassette in an underground Manhattan club and became the act's first important industry influencer.  Liben and Rosen then cut their own 12-inch dance single, which was signed by Arista Records' Simon Potts in London and in New York by Elektra Records' President Bob Kraznow before the band even had a name,  which eventually became Ebn-Ozn. "AEIOU" went top 20 on the Billboard Club Chart, establishing OZN as one of the first white rappers in the industry. "AEIOU"'s video, a Los Angeles Times Top 10 Video of the Year, received domestic and international radio, club and press exposure and was featured on Beavis and Butt-head through the '90s.

EBN-OZN's first full-length album, Feeling Cavalier, released by Elektra in 1984, went Top 20 on the College Radio Chart (the equivalent of the Alternative Chart at that time) and their second single, "Bag Lady (I Wonder)" went Top 40 on the Billboard Club Chart. The video for "Bag Lady" starred Tony and Emmy Award winner Imogene Coca and like "AEIOU," enjoyed  worldwide television and club play.

EBN/OZN immediately caught on with significant DJ and radio programmer influencers from a wide spectrum of genres, for example Chicago/NYC club DJ Frankie Knuckles who at the time had a large underground following of LGBTQ and straight people of color and whites; New York late night radio mix show host Tony Humphries, alternative music programming director Dennis McNamara of New York/Long Island's cutting edge, WLIR, Frankie Crocker of New York City's leading African American station WBLS, Los Angele's biggest alternative rock station KROQ and the Stevie Wonder-owned KJLH.

They received rave reviews for their album, singles, videos, live shows and versatile musicianship. EBN played guitar, bass, keyboards and programmed. OZN, sang, rapped, played keyboards and performed in spoken word "character voices," in a variety of accents. They were covered in Time magazine, People, US and The New York Post. Ozn was declared the "greatest white rapper alive" by Playboy and called the "new American sex symbol" by the Boston Globe. EBN was also featured in Guitar Player magazine.

EBN/OZN toured the US to rave reviews after quite a rocky start as they were the first US band to ever attempt syncing up a Fairlight music computer onstage with live instruments and the ensuing technical difficulties caused a major rift with British synth/pop star Howard Jones whom they had shared the bill with.

The duo split up in 1985, EBN went on to run his exclusive SOHO studio working with Scritti Politti and Arif Mardin, while OZN moved to Los Angeles and started his own label, One Voice Records and his own solo act, Dada Nada.

DaDa NaDa

DADA NADA received a distribution deal with Polydor/UK and distributed the label independently in North America, landing two Top Five Billboard dance hits, "Haunted House" (the first House record by a white artist to chart in North America) and "Deep Love" both of which he sang, rapped, produced and wrote. The list of important Dada Nada supporters

His 1991 UK release "The Good Thing/Give It All I Got", a downbeat mid tempo jazz ballad (written & produced by OZN, Steve Wight and Bob Greenberg. Mixed by Bad Boy Bill) is a two-song, 12-inch single, which as an import, hit No. 3 on the Record Mirror Cool Cuts Chart and No. 25 on the Record Mirror Mainstream Dance Chart.

OZN's collaborators on Dada Nada tracks included the legendary Godfather of House the late Frankie Knuckles - "Frankie was one of the first guys to play EBN-OZN and when I started releasing House tracks he was giving me full support - he never cared that I was white, which back then, unlike now, was just not done.  He loved the music - that's all he was about. I'm ever so grateful" along with House music pioneers Bad Boy Bill, David Morales, Mike "Hitman" Wilson, Steve Wight (now an associate professor of recording arts at Cal State), and Bob Greenberg.

OZN performed live on a tour of dance clubs in the United States including shows in Miami, Washington D.C. Philadelphia, Houston and Detroit. After a 1990 shooting incident involving audience members in Chicago, where Dada Nada was something of a dance mix radio and club sensation, he took a years-long break from performing.

EBN died in 1998 of a heart attack in Soho, New York and is survived by his wife Sallie Moore Liben and son Max Liben.

In April 2015, OZN announced on Facebook and Twitter that he was making his first record in 25 years inspired by the Charlie Hebdo assassinations, Je Suis Paris!. An anthem for the growing, global pro-peace, anti-terror movement, he produced and wrote the track with Belinda Carlisle collaborator Gabe Lopez, supported by Julian Coryell, son of jazz legend Larry Coryell and guitarist for (Alanis Morissette), Chris Golden bass player for hip hop star Exzibit, Gibi Dos Santos Sergio Mendes' long-time Brazilian percussionist, and background vocalists Mindy Jones of Moby and Mark Strom of the boy band Innovate.

Released in summer 2016 with remixes by Richard Cutmore who had 10 Billboard Number One's at the time, House of Virus and American, 19 year-old newcomer Mntna, the record's U.K. release peaked at #13 on the Music Week Commercial Pop Dance Chart in October 2016, after OZN recorded additional vocals with the lyric "I Am Orlando" in reference to the Orlando, Florida Pulse nightclub anti-gay terror attack, establishing it as an LGBT anthem through the United Kingdom, where it received widespread play on Gaydio.com, the largest internet radio station in the United Kingdom.

After British music journalist Victoria Dowling called him a "white Pharrell Williams."  - plus the success of Je Suis Paris/I Am Orlando, OZN/Dada Nada was thrust OZN back into the spotlight. In an interview with Scottish journalist Scott McGlynn he said, "This was supposed to be a personal outlet for expressing my outrage by singing a song that protested the murder of innocent people - and somehow it morphed into a hit record without a record label. Hell, I've been out of that world for 25 years. And now people want interviews, photos - they want to pull me away from my place behind the camera and push me in front of it again - in front of a microphone again. This is totally unexpected. How is this even possible?" 

In the 16 July 2016 edition of Music Week OZN was quoted, "I no longer care about things that used to be important to me when I was young: fame, extravagant materialism, self-aggrandizement...all that matters to me is my spiritual life, my family, love, my creativity, reframing my narrative, friends and the end of suffering for all beings."

His followup track, released from 2017 to 2019, "We Can Feel It" had 1.2 Million listens on SoundCloud.com; reached Number 9 on the Music Week Commercial Pop Dance Chart in December 2017, Number 15 on the Billboard Dance Club Songs chart in February 2018, and in spring 2019 hit #44 on the US Alternative Radio "Sub Modern" Chart.  Again, OZN/Dada Nada proved to be a darling of the music press garnering rave reviews for his singing, song writing and production from BroadwayWorld.com, WeRaveYou.com, iHouseYou.com, VentsMagazine, Gigslutz.co.UK and others.

Film industry career highlights
OZN went on to a producing and screenwriting career in the film business, earning a Certificate in Television Writing from University of California, Los Angeles.

He worked first for free for Oliver Stone and Janet Yang's Ixtlan Films, trading his time in exchange for learning the development and production end of the movie business.  He went on to become a paid first-call reader for A-list material for Stone. He was then hired at Miramax, as reader for Pulp Fiction under Oscar-winning producer Richard Gladstein and as contract development exec for much of their European fare and some of horror division Dimension Films' material. He also served as script analyst at Creative Arts Agency (CAA) on projects for Sydney Pollack, Louis Malle, Paula Weinstein and James Cameron's Lightstorm Entertainment.

OZN partnered with Ted Danson as executive producers to option Elegies for Angels Punks and Raging Queens, playwright Bill Russell's West End London AIDS drama, for Anasazi/Paramount Television. Danson and OZN attached Michael Douglas, Richard Gere, Patrick Stewart, Whoopi Goldberg, Jason Priestley and Elizabeth Taylor as well as Danson. However, it remains un-produced on television.

OZN and writer/producer Colin Greene (now a Vice-President at Sony Studios) sold Storm Warning, a $100 million-plus film, to Paramount for producer Mario Kassar, making the front page of the Daily Variety.

OZN and Greene's I Witness, (originally titled "God's Witness") (Universal/Promark) starring Jeff Daniels, James Spader and Portia de Rossi, received the 2003 Method Fest Best Screenplay Award.   Director: Rowdy Herrington, Producers: Jon Eramer, David Bixler, Shelly Strong, Ed Cathell III, Julia Verdin, Robert Ozn & Colin Greene, Paul De Souza.

OZN left the industry in 2003 to raise his children and returned in 2008, as part of the production team of "Turned Towards the Sun," a UK documentary about the British aristocrat, war hero, London Times correspondent, author and out bisexual Micky Burn.  The film premiered at the British Film Institute in London in October 2012 to excellent reviews, earning director Greg Olliver a Grierson Award nomination.

2011/2012: Screenwriter Sy Fy Channel's "Earth's Final Hours]," (pseudonym Robert Wescott) (Cinetel 2011) (Airdate 2012).

2015: One of the Executive Producers, along with Julian Lennon of BAFTA Board member Julia Verdin's film short "Lost Girls," which won awards at the 2016 Los Angeles Independent Film Festival and IndieFEST.

Social and political activism
A guest at the Obama Administration's 2016 White House Bisexual Community Briefing, OZN served as the Chairperson as well as the Advocacy Chair of the Los Angeles Bisexual Task Force (LABTF)for three years, a bisexual advocacy non-profit operating out of the Los Angeles LGBT Center, presenting workshops for LGBT youth at the Center and University of Southern California as well as pressing for political change within and without the LGBT community.  http://www.bicenter.org.

In 2017, he was the first male bisexual to ever speak at a Los Angeles LGBT Pride March (to over 100,000 people) in its 47-year history. "It was a short pre-recorded video shown on huge projection screens along the parade route - it wasn't live - but I'll take it as a solid first step for all bi-plus people, who historically have been marginalized within our greater community."

Awards and honors
Judge: Writers Guild of America Awards (longform television) 2006, 2005, 2004
LA Times Video Top 10 of the Year for EBN-OZN's "AEIOU Sometimes Y" 1983
Method Fest, Best Screenplay for "I Witness" 2003
IFP Emerging Narrative Voices (Independent Feature Project) Screenplay (unproduced) 2002: Deadbeats
City of West Hollywood's "Celebrate Bisexuality Day" September 23, 2017, Proclamation Awarded to Robert Ozn on Behalf of the Los Angeles Bi Task Force.

References

External links

Living people
American bisexual writers
American male musical theatre actors
American pop musicians
American male screenwriters
Indiana University alumni
University of California, Los Angeles alumni
Skidmore College alumni
Singers from New York City
Screenwriters from New York (state)
1964 births